is a Japanese speed skater. He competed in two events at the 1968 Winter Olympics.

References

1943 births
Living people
Japanese male speed skaters
Olympic speed skaters of Japan
Speed skaters at the 1968 Winter Olympics
Sportspeople from Aomori Prefecture
20th-century Japanese people